42 Aquarii is a single star located 447 light years away from the Sun in the zodiac constellation of Aquarius. 42 Aquarii is its Flamsteed designation. It is visible to the naked eye as a faint, orange-hued star with an apparent visual magnitude of 5.34. This object is moving further from the Sun with a heliocentric radial velocity of around +13 km/s.

This object is an evolved giant star with a stellar classification of K1 III, most likely (82% chance) on the horizontal branch. It is around 470 million years old with a projected rotational velocity of 3.4 km/s. The star has over three times the mass of the Sun and has expanded to 11 times the Sun's radius. It is radiating 70 times the luminosity of the Sun from its enlarged photosphere at an effective temperature of 4,980 K.

References

K-type giants
Aquarii, 042
Aquarius (constellation)
Durchmusterung objects
211361
110000
8496